Sigmaringen is a Landkreis (district) in the south of Baden-Württemberg, Germany. Neighboring districts are (from north clockwise) Reutlingen, Biberach, Ravensburg, Bodensee, Constance,
Tuttlingen, and Zollernalbkreis.

History

The area of the district was owned by several different states historically. It was split between many minor rulers before the German Mediatisation of the late 18th and early 19th centuries. By 1806 it had become a border area between the Grand Duchy of Baden, the Kingdom of Württemberg, and the much smaller principality of Hohenzollern-Sigmaringen embedded between them.

In 1849 Hohenzollern-Sigmaringen became part of the Prussian Province of Hohenzollern (along with the principality of Hohenzollern-Hechingen). After WWII it became part of the French-controlled state of Württemberg-Hohenzollern until 1952 when it became part of the modern  of Baden-Württemberg. In 1973 the district was enlarged by adding municipalities from the neighboring districts: Saulgau, Stockach, Überlingen and Reutlingen. A roughly equal portion of the district's area came from each of the three historic states.

Geography
The district is located in the mountains of the Swabian Alb, Linzgau and Upper Swabia.

Coat of arms
The deer in the coat of arms is the symbol of the duchy of Sigmaringen as well as that of the city of Sigmaringen. This symbol probably is from the Counts of Peutengau-Hirschberg who were the Lords of Sigmaringen until 1253. Hirsch is the German word for deer. The red color with the white bar below the deer derives from the Austrian coat of arms, as part of the district belonged to Austria historically.

Towns and municipalities

References

External links

Official website (German)

 
Tübingen (region)
Districts of Baden-Württemberg
Districts of Prussia